Hyloxalus littoralis (in Spanish: ranita silbadora) is a species of frog in the family Dendrobatidae. It is endemic to Peru where it is known from Lima (the type locality, a small pond found in front of the beach), Huánuco, and Ancash Regions. Population near Lima was an introduction one and may now be extinct. It natural altitudinal range is  asl.

Its natural habitats are coastal 'desert' and dry shrublands. It usually occurs close to streams with dense vegetation. It is a common and adaptable species.

References

littoralis
Amphibians of the Andes
Amphibians of Peru
Endemic fauna of Peru
Amphibians described in 1984
Taxonomy articles created by Polbot